Al-Qabl Al-Alla is a sub-district located in al-Sha'ar District, Ibb Governorate, Yemen.Al-Qabl Al-Alla had a population of 4087 as of 2004.

References 

Sub-districts in Ash Sha'ar District